The Conservative government under Benjamin Disraeli had been defeated at the 1868 general election, so in December 1868 the victorious William Gladstone formed his first government. He introduced reforms in the British Army (including the abolition of the purchase system), the legal system (establishing the Supreme Court of Judicature) and the Civil Service, and disestablished the Church of Ireland. In foreign affairs he pursued a peaceful policy. His ministry was defeated in the 1874 election, whereupon Disraeli formed a ministry and Gladstone retired as Leader of the Liberal Party.

Cabinet

December 1868 – February 1874

Notes

† The Earl de Grey was created the Marquess of Ripon in 1871.
‡ Henry Austin Bruce was created Baron Aberdare in 1873.
William Gladstone served as both First Lord of the Treasury and Chancellor of the Exchequer between August 1873 and February 1874.

Changes
July 1870: On the death of Lord Clarendon, Lord Granville succeeds him as Foreign Secretary.  Lord Kimberley succeeds Granville as Colonial Secretary, and Lord Halifax succeeds Kimberley as Lord Privy Seal.  W.E. Forster enters the cabinet as vice president of the council.
January 1871: Chichester Fortescue succeeds Bright at the Board of Trade.  Lord Hartington succeeds Fortescue as Chief Secretary for Ireland.  Hartington's successor as Postmaster-General is not in the Cabinet.
March 1871: G.J. Goschen succeeds Childers at the Admiralty.  James Stansfeld succeeds Goschen at the Poor Law Board (which becomes the Local Government Board later that year).
August 1872: Hugh Childers returns to the Cabinet as Chancellor of the Duchy of Lancaster.
October 1872: Lord Selborne succeeds Lord Hatherley as Lord Chancellor.
August 1873: Lord Aberdare (formerly Henry Austin Bruce) succeeds Lord Ripon as Lord President.  Robert Lowe succeeds Aberdare as Home Secretary.  Gladstone himself takes over the Exchequer.
September 1873: John Bright returns to the Cabinet, succeeding Childers at the Duchy of Lancaster.

List of ministers
Cabinet members are listed in bold face.

Notes

References

Ministries of Queen Victoria
British ministries
Government
1860s in the United Kingdom
1868 establishments in the United Kingdom
1870s in the United Kingdom
1874 disestablishments in the United Kingdom
Ministry 1
Cabinets established in 1868
Cabinets disestablished in 1874